Marco Paolini (born 20 April 1995) is an Italian footballer who plays as a defender.

Career

Cesena
Paolini was a youth product of Romagna club Cesena. He was the member of the under-17 youth team in 2011–12 season. In the next season Paolini made 23 out of possible 26 games for Cesena's reserve.

Paolini received a call-up to the under-18 national team in January 2013, for the Valentin Granatkin Memorial.

Parma
On 29 June 2013 half of the registration rights of Paolini were exchanged with hard of the "card" of Davide Adorni of Parma F.C.

On 22 July 2013 Paolini left for San Marino Calcio of the Republic of San Marino, an enclave of Italy (border Romagna and Marche), but was participating in Italian third division. The club also signed Yago Del Piero and Saša Čičarević from Cesena in the same formula in temporary deals.

Paolini made his debut in the second match of the league cup. Paolini also played the first match of the league.

In June 2014 Parma acquired Paolini outright, as well as Cesena acquired Adorni outright.

On 9 July 2014 his loan to San Marino was extended.

References

Italian footballers
A.C. Cesena players
Parma Calcio 1913 players
A.S.D. Victor San Marino players
Serie C players
Italy youth international footballers
Association football defenders
1995 births
Living people